Derhachi Raion was a raion (district) in Kharkiv Oblast of Ukraine. Its administrative center was the town of Derhachi. The raion was abolished on 18 July 2020 as part of the administrative reform of Ukraine, which reduced the number of raions of Kharkiv Oblast to seven. The area of Derhachi Raion was merged into Kharkiv Raion. The last estimate of the raion population was

Subdivisions
At the time of disestablishment, the raion consisted of three hromadas:
 Derhachi urban hromada with the administration in Derhachi;
 Mala Danylivka settlement hromada with the administration in the urban-type settlement of Mala Danylivka;
 Solonytsivka settlement hromada with the administration in the urban-type settlement of Solonytsivka.

Border crossings

Auto 
 (Crimea highway,): Hoptivka ( Гоптівка, Дергачівський район, Ха́рківська о́бласть (Харківщина)) – Nekhoteyevka, Belgorodsky Raion, Belgorodskaya Oblast( Нехотеевка, Белгородский райо́н, Белгоро́дская о́бласть)

Railway 
Kozacha Lopan ( Козача Лопань, Дергачівський район, Ха́рківська о́бласть (Харківщина)) – Dolbino, Belgorodsky Raion, Belgorodskaya Oblast( Долбино, Белгородский райо́н, Белгоро́дская о́бласть)

See also 
 Russia–Ukraine border

References 

Former raions of Kharkiv Oblast
Russia–Ukraine border crossings
1923 establishments in Ukraine
Ukrainian raions abolished during the 2020 administrative reform